Atokou  is a village in western Benin. It is located in Bantè commune in the Collines Department.

Nearby towns and villages include Lero (4.0 nm), Akpouati (1.0 nm), Keon (1.0 nm), Kikon (4.2 nm)
and Okpedie(5.4 nm) 
.

References

External links
Satellite map at Maplandia.com

Populated places in Benin